The Treaty of Maastricht, signed in 1843 by Belgium and the Netherlands four years after the Treaty of London established Belgian independence, finally settled the border between the two countries.

Border enclaves
Inability to decide a clear line of demarcation in Baarle-Hertog resulted in the division of the disputed territory into 5732 separate parcels of land.  These formed part of a very complicated frontier which sometimes passes through houses, and has tiny enclaves, due to land ownership dating back to the 12th century. Belgian enclaves in otherwise Dutch territory even have at times Dutch counter-enclaves within them.

Part of the left bank of the Meuse, near Maastricht, came back to the Netherlands.

See also
 Baarle-Hertog
 Treaty of London (1839)
 Iron Rhine and Iron Rhine Treaty of 1873
 Maastricht Treaty of the European Union

References

External links

History of Maastricht
19th century in the Netherlands
1843 in Belgium
1843 in the Netherlands
Treaties of Belgium
Treaties of the Netherlands
Belgium–Netherlands border
Boundary treaties
1843 treaties
August 1843 events